Tennis at the 2017 Pacific Mini Games in Port Vila, Vanuatu was held on December 4–15, 2017.

Medal summary

Medal table

Men's

Men's tournaments

Seeds

Singles

Finals

Top half

Bottom half

Play-off 3/4

Team

Preliminary round

Group A

Fiji vs. Samoa

New Caledonia vs. Fiji

New Caledonia vs. Samoa

Group B

Vanuatu vs. Tuvalu

Tuvalu vs. Kiribati

Vanuatu vs. Kiribati

Group C

Solomon Islands vs. Tonga

Papua New Guinea vs. Solomon Islands

Papua New Guinea vs. Tonga

Semi-finals

Vanuatu vs. Tonga

Fiji vs. New Caledonia

Women's tournaments

Seeds

Singles

Finals

Top half

Bottom half

Play-off 3/4

Team

Preliminary round

Group A

Solomon Islands vs. Fiji

New Caledonia vs. Fiji

New Caledonia vs. Solomon Islands

Group B

Vanuatu vs. Tonga

Samoa vs. Vanuatu

Samoa vs. Tonga

Third Place

Solomon Islands vs. Vanuatu

Final

Samoa vs. New Caledonia

See also
 Tennis at the Pacific Games

References

2017 Pacific Mini Games
2017
Pacific Mini Games